Qaabrîne (also known as Qa‘brīn)   is a populated place in the Akkar Governorate, Lebanon.

References

External links
  Mqaitaa - Qaabrine - Kfar Melki - Rmoul, Localiban

Populated places in Akkar District